Yeongjong station is a metro station located in Unbuk-dong, Jung District, Incheon, South Korea. Although it was present as a station shell when the first phase of the line opened (as a 2-track, 2-platform station), it was opened almost a decade later on March 26, 2016.

Structure
The form of the platform is a two-sided four-line double-sum platform. If the 2nd or 3rd station inside is mainline, the 1st and 4th station outside is mainline, and if the direct train is overtaking, the general train is evacuated by handling passengers on the mainline.

From the time of its opening, a two-sided, two- way counter platform structure was constructed in advance to prepare for the new station. However, as the plan was changed so that the sub-main line, which was originally planned to be installed at Cheongna International City station, was built at this station, the new station was constructed and used at a location slightly shifted toward Cheongna International City station.

References

Railway stations opened in 2016
Metro stations in Incheon
2016 establishments in South Korea
Jung District, Incheon
Seoul Metropolitan Subway stations
AREX